Maggies may refer to:
 Collingwood Football Club, Australian rules football club
 Maggies Centre, a charity in the United Kingdom and Hong Kong